Carlos Bojorquez (born 26 June 1972) is a Mexican professional boxer who competed from 1997 to 2007, challenging for the IBF light middleweight title in 2004.

Professional career
He has fought for the vacant IBF Light Middleweight title and has held a number of fringe belts. Throughout his long career he has fought top fighters such as Verno Phillips, Pernell Whitaker, and Ike Quartey. His most recent fight ended in a points decision (as opposed to a finish, which is usually the case for Bojorquez) loss to Eduardo Sánchez (15-6-2).

External links

1972 births
Living people
Boxers from Sinaloa
Sportspeople from Los Mochis
Mexican male boxers
Light-middleweight boxers